James Edward Frisby Jarvis (21 January 1875 – 24 January 1962) was an English cricketer. Jarvis was a right-handed batsman who played as a wicket-keeper. He was born at Leicester, Leicestershire.

Jarvis made a single first-class appearance for Leicestershire against Middlesex at Lord's in the 1900 County Championship. In Leicestershire's first-innings of 184 all out, Jarvis batted at number eleven and was dismissed for a duck by J. T. Hearne. In their second-innings, he ended not out without scoring. Middlesex won the match by 5 wickets. This was his only major appearance for the county.

He died at Knighton, Leicestershire on 24 January 1962.

References

External links
James Jarvis at Cricinfo
James Jarvis at CricketArchive

1875 births
1962 deaths
Cricketers from Leicester
English cricketers
Leicestershire cricketers
Wicket-keepers